The Cezmi Or Memorial (Turkish: Uluslararası Cezmi Or Kupası) is an annual track and field meeting which takes place in Istanbul, Turkey.

The meeting is held in honour of late Turkish sprinter Cezmi Or, who set Turkish records in the men's 100 metres and 200 metres, but died of typhoid fever in 1945 at the age of 24. The memorial meeting was first held one year after his death and has continued annually without interruption. It is held under the auspices of the Turkish Athletic Federation and Can Korkmazoğlu is the current meet organiser.

The competition, which is undertaken at the Enka Sadi Gülçelik Stadium, Stadium holds Classic Meeting status from the continental governing body, European Athletics. Both international and Turkish athletes compete in the meetings events. At the 2005 edition of the competition, Turkish hammer thrower Eşref Apak set the current national record of 81.45 metres for the event, which is also the meet record.

Meeting records

Men

Women

References

European Athletic Association meetings
Sport in Istanbul
Athletics in Turkey
Recurring sporting events established in 1946
1946 establishments in Turkey
Annual track and field meetings
June sporting events